The Enlightener Prize for Russian-language non-fiction literature (Премия в области 
литературы нон-фикшн «Просветитель») is a literary prize created by the Dynasty Foundation in 2008 by Dmitry Zimin. The prize is 720,000 rubles (approximately $11,386 as of July 2019), authors of the short-listed books will receive 120,000 rubles ($1,900), and publishers of the winning books will receive 130,000 rubles ($2,000) for promoting the books in the market.  The purpose of the Prize is to support Russian-speaking scientists and technical writers, who are able to talk simply about the newest discoveries and research.

The third Thursday of November is officially considered Enlightener Day and that is when the ceremony takes place every year. 

The 2014 jury was led by the critic Alexander F. Gavrilov.

Award Process 
Over 150 books are submitted into the competition every year. The Organizing Committee creates a list of 25 works in two categories: Humanities and Natural and Exact Sciences. Topics include ideas, theories, interesting facts, and new discoveries, and they have to be at least 30,000 words. The application must be accompanied by a document which confirms that the author agrees with their participation in the competition, and each book or manuscript can be submitted only once. After that, an independent jury selects 8 short-listed books. A book nominated for the prize must be written in Russian 

The Enlightener Prize Council was created in 2012, and it includes jury members, former finalists and authors. Their role is to assist the organizing committee in nominating and evaluating the books submitted.

Notes

Awards established in 2008
Russian literary awards